The Varanasi–Kanpur Central Varuna Express is an Express train belonging to Northern Railway zone that runs between  and  in India. It is currently being operated with 24227/24228 train numbers on five days in a week.

Service

The 24227/Varuna Express has an average speed of 52 km/hr and covers 355 km in 6h 50m. 24228/Varuna Express has an average speed of 47 km/hr and covers 355 km in 7h 30m.

Route and halts 

The important halts of the train are:

Coach composition

The train has standard ICF rakes with max speed of 110 kmph. The train consists of 17 coaches:

 1 Chair Car 
 14 General
 2 Generators cum Luggage/parcel van

Traction

Both trains are hauled by a Kanpur Loco Shed-based WAP-4 electric locomotive from Kanpur to Varanasi and vice versa.

See also 

 Varanasi Junction railway station
 Kanpur Central railway station
 Varuna Express

Notes

External links 

 24227/Varuna Express
 24228/Varuna Express

References 

Passenger trains originating from Varanasi
Trains from Kanpur
Express trains in India
Named passenger trains of India